Emil Lloyd "Buzzie" Reutimann (born May 7, 1941) is a former NASCAR driver from Zephyrhills, Florida. He is the father of former driver David Reutimann. Reutimann was inducted into the Northeast Dirt Modified Hall of Fame in 1997 and the Eastern Motorsport Press Association Hall of Fame in 2006.

Reutimann began working on race cars at age 13 despite his mother's protests. Primarily a short track racer, he made one NASCAR start on November 11, 1962 in Tampa, Florida at Golden Gate Speedway. He started 18th and finished 10th in the event, which was considered part of the 1963 season. He was given the nickname "Buzzie" at birth after several nurses noticed he made buzzing sounds as an infant. He drove the number #00, and so did his son David in the Sprint Cup Series.

In 1972 Reutimann won the dirt modified track championship at the Orange County Fair Speedway in Middletown, New York.  That same year he captured the win at the prestigious Eastern States 200.

Now in his seventies, Reutimann continues to race and win to this day.  He competes weekly at East Bay Raceway Park in Tampa, Florida.

References

External links
 

Living people
1941 births
People from Zephyrhills, Florida
Racing drivers from Florida
NASCAR drivers
Sportspeople from the Tampa Bay area